2008 American novels
American science fiction novels
2008 science fiction novels
Military science fiction novels
StarFist series
Fiction set in the 25th century
Del Rey books
Wings of Hell is a science fiction novel by American writers David Sherman and Dan Cragg; it was released on December 30, 2008.  It is set in the 25th Century in Sherman and Cragg's StarFist Saga. It is the 13th novel of the series, followed by Double Jeopardy.